Metyltetraprole is a quinone outside inhibitor fungicide sold under the brand name Pavecto by its inventor, Sumitomo Chemical. It is the only tetrazolinone fungicide and the only one in the Fungicide Resistance Action Committee's subgroup 11A.It is a inhibitor of the respiratory chain (Complex III), this making it non specific of fungus, it will inhibit all organisms with mitochondria.

Development
Metyltetraprole was developed specifically to find an a.i. with the same mode of action (a QI) but with sufficiently different chemistry as to avoid "critical" QI resistance increasing around the world.

Target pathogens
Metyltetraprole is highly effective against Alternaria triticina.

Resistance
Developed because of increasing resistance to the main group of QIs. See §Development above.

Cross-resistance
It does not suffer cross-resistance with the resistance against 11 conferred by the cytochrome b mutation G143A. Cross-resistance against F129L is unassessed.

References

Fungicides
Tetrazoles
Chloroarenes
Pyrazoles